Fort Run is an unincorporated community in Hardy County, West Virginia, United States. It takes its name from the adjacent stream and lies off U.S. Route 48 to the east of Moorefield.

References

Unincorporated communities in Hardy County, West Virginia
Unincorporated communities in West Virginia